An ACE inhibitor and thiazide combination is a drug combination used to treat hypertension (high blood pressure). They are given by mouth. ACE inhibitors reduce the activity of angiotensin-converting enzyme (ACE) which produces angiotensin II, a hormone that constricts blood vessels. Thiazides are a class of diuretics that inhibit the thiazide receptor, thereby increasing urine production and reducing excess water and salt in the body. Several organizations recommend combination therapy for hypertension in cases of failure of a single drug to achieve target blood pressure, or even as a first line treatment for some patients.

Examples

Enalapril/hydrochlorothiazide (trade name Enalapril comp), wherein enalapril is the ACE inhibitor and hydrochlorothiazide is the thiazide.
Quinapril/hydrochlorothiazide (trade name Accuretic)
Lisinopril/hydrochlorothiazide is marketed as Prinzide, Zestoretic, and many others.

Fosinopril/hydrochlorothiazide

Fosinopril/hydrochlorothiazide (trade name Monopril HCT) has a boxed warning about its risk to cause morbidity and mortality in the baby when being used during pregnancy (2nd and 3rd trimesters).

FDA  modified its labeling on February, 2009 to include a precaution of drug interaction with gold. "Nitritoid reactions (symptoms include facial flushing, nausea, vomiting and hypotension) have been reported rarely in patients on therapy with injectable gold (sodium aurothiomalate) and concomitant ACE inhibitor therapy including Monopril/Monopril HCT."

See also
Perindopril/indapamide, a combination of an ACE inhibitor and a thiazide-like diuretic

References

Diuretics
Combination drugs
ACE inhibitors